Kandidato is a Philippine television public affairs show broadcast by GMA Network. Focusing on the 2010 Philippine presidential elections and the 2013 Senatorial (midterm) elections. Hosted by Arnold Clavio, Malou Mangahas and Howie Severino, it premiered on March 3, 2010. The show concluded on May 2, 2013 with a total of 20 episodes.

Format
For 2010 presidential elections, each episode features one of the presidential candidates who will run this 2010 Philippine presidential elections, and in 2013 senatorial elections, 3 candidates will answer questions from the panel composed of Arnold Clavio, Howie Severino and Malou Mangahas in a similar fashion as a job interview. The panel has three sets of questions; easy, average, and hard levels.

In the Easy category, the panelists will ask the questions which is about the personality, family and personal life of the candidates. Average category, on the other hand ask the platform of the candidates and on how they can resolve the problems of our country today, such poverty, corruption, education, and others. The hard level focuses how the candidate answer on his/her controversies that lie on them.

Episodes

Ratings
According to AGB Nielsen Philippines' Mega Manila household television ratings, the final episode of Kandidato scored a 5% rating.

References

2010 Philippine television series debuts
2013 Philippine television series endings
Filipino-language television shows
GMA Network original programming
GMA Integrated News and Public Affairs shows
Philippine television shows